Alice Capitani (born 27 October 1984) is an Italian former gymnast. She competed at the 2000 Summer Olympics.

References

External links
 

1984 births
Living people
Italian female artistic gymnasts
Olympic gymnasts of Italy
Gymnasts at the 2000 Summer Olympics
Gymnasts from Rome